Farer is a British watch brand established in 2015. Its watch names are typically explorer or land speed record themed.

History
In 2015 Farer was founded by Stuart Finlayson, Jono Holt, Ben Lewin and Paul Sweetenham to create a range of quartz watches. Previously, Sweetenham worked as a watch buyer for a duty-free company and  then had an extensive retail career, Holt, Lewin and Finlayson ran a London-based branding and marketing agency.

Farer's first product line consisted of nine quartz watches.

In September 2016, the brand added three automatic watches to its range, naming them after British Royal Navy ships used by British explorers. Their automatic watches’ winding crowns were uniquely made of pure Bronze, which paginate with age and wear.

The brand released a range of GMT  and Diving watches (Aqua Compressors) in 2017, and then a range of 37 mm hand-wound cushion-cased watches in 2018. In 2019, they released two land speed record themed quartz watches, named after Ainsdale and Pendine Sands. Later, that year, they released a range of chronograph watches.

The company operates in Ascot, Berkshire.

Branding 
The brand claimed to have derived its name from the terms seafarer or wayfarer and named its first range after famous explorers, such as George Mallory, Amy Johnson, Martin Frobisher and Howard Carter. Moreover, it called its first range of automatic watches after ships British explorers supposedly used, such as HMS Beagle, and HMS Endurance.

Farer named three of its chronograph watches, after pre-war British land speed record holders, Ernest Eldridge, John Cobb and Henry Seagrave.

Farer claims to seek inspiration from the watch designs of the 60s and 70s.

Manufacture
Farer designs its watches in London, while Swiss manufacturer, Roventa Henex, produces the final product in Bienne, Switzerland.

Farer's Beagle, Hopewell and Endurance models use ETA 2824-2 movements.

On 26 August 2020, Farer had introduced the GMT Bezel Collection which includes such varieties as Charlton, Maze and the Crooms.

References

Watch brands
British companies established in 2015
Companies based in London